The Australian Open is a tennis tournament held annually at Melbourne Park in Melbourne, Victoria, Australia. The tournament is the first of the four Grand Slam tennis events held each year, preceding the French Open, Wimbledon, and the US Open. The Australian Open starts in the middle of January and continues for two weeks coinciding with the Australia Day holiday. It features men's and women's singles; men's, women's, and mixed doubles; junior's championships; and wheelchair, legends, and exhibition events.  Before 1988, it was played on grass courts, but since then two types of hardcourt surfaces have been used: green-coloured Rebound Ace up to 2007 and blue Plexicushion since 2008.

First held in 1905 as the Australasian championships, the Australian Open has grown to become one of the biggest sporting events in the Southern Hemisphere. Nicknamed "the happy slam", the Australian Open is the highest attended Grand Slam event, with more than 902,000 people attending the 2023 tournament. It was also the first Grand Slam tournament to feature indoor play during wet weather or extreme heat with its three primary courts, Rod Laver Arena, John Cain Arena and the refurbished Margaret Court Arena equipped with retractable roofs.

The Australian Open features men's and women's singles, men's and women's doubles, mixed doubles, and wheelchair competitions. It is played on hard courts and is known for its fast-paced and aggressive style of play. The tournament has a long history dating back to 1905 and has been held at the Melbourne Park complex since 1988. The Australian Open is a major contributor to the Victorian economy; the 2020 Australian Open injected $387.7 million into the state's economy, while over the preceding decade the Australian Open had contributed more than $2.71 billion in economic benefits to Victoria and generated 1775 jobs for the state, with these jobs being predominantly in the accommodation, hotels, cafés and trade services sectors.

History

The Australian Open is managed by Tennis Australia, formerly the Lawn Tennis Association of Australia (LTAA), and was first played at the Warehouseman's Cricket Ground in Melbourne in November 1905. The facility is now known as the Albert Reserve Tennis Centre, and was a grass court.

The tournament was first known as the Australasian Championships. It became the Australian Championships in 1927. Then, in 1969, it became the Australian Open. Since 1905, it has been staged 110 times in five Australian cities: Melbourne (66 times), Sydney (17 times), Adelaide (15 times), Brisbane (7 times), Perth (3 times), and two New Zealander cities: Christchurch (1906) and Hastings (1912).

Though started in 1905, the tournament was not designated as being a major championship until 1924, by the International Lawn Tennis Federation (ILTF) at a 1923 meeting. The tournament committee changed the structure of the tournament to include seeding at that time. In the period of 1916–1918, no tournament was organized due to World War I.

During World War II, the tournament was not held in the period from 1941 to 1945.
In 1972, it was decided to stage the tournament in Melbourne each year because it attracted the biggest patronage of any Australian city. The tournament was played at the Kooyong Lawn Tennis Club from 1972 until its move to the new Flinders Park complex in 1988.

The new facilities at Flinders Park were envisaged to meet the demands of a tournament that had outgrown Kooyong's capacity. The move to Flinders Park was an immediate success, with a 90 percent increase in attendance in 1988 (266,436) on the previous year at Kooyong (140,000).

Because of Australia's geographic remoteness, very few foreign players entered this tournament in the early 20th century. In the 1920s, the trip by ship from Europe to Australia took about 45 days. The first tennis players who came by boats were the US Davis Cup players in November 1946. Even inside Australia, many players could not travel easily. In Christchurch in 1906, of a small field of 10 players, only two Australians attended and the tournament was won by a New Zealander.

The first tournaments of the Australasian Championships suffered from the competition of the other Australasian tournaments. Before 1905, all Australian states, and New Zealand, had their own championships; the first being organised in 1880 in Melbourne and called the Championship of the Colony of Victoria (later the Championship of Victoria). In those years, the best two players – Australian Norman Brookes (whose name is now written on the men's singles cup) and New Zealander Anthony Wilding – almost did not play this tournament.

Brookes took part once and won in 1911, and Wilding entered and won the competition twice (1906 and 1909). Their meetings in the Victorian Championships (or at Wimbledon) helped to determine the best Australasian players. Even when the Australasian Championships were held in Hastings, New Zealand, in 1912, Wilding, though three times Wimbledon champion, did not come back to his home country. It was a recurring problem for all players of the era. Brookes went to Europe only three times, where he reached the Wimbledon Challenge Round once and then won Wimbledon twice.

Thus, many players had never played the Austral(as)ian amateur or open championships: the Doherty brothers, William Larned, Maurice McLoughlin, Beals Wright, Bill Johnston, Bill Tilden, René Lacoste, Henri Cochet, Bobby Riggs, Jack Kramer, Ted Schroeder, Pancho Gonzales, Budge Patty, and others, while Brookes, Ellsworth Vines, Jaroslav Drobný, came just once. Even in the 1960s and 1970s, when travel was less difficult, leading players such as Manuel Santana, Jan Kodeš, Manuel Orantes, Ilie Năstase (who only came once, when 35 years old) and Björn Borg came rarely or not at all.

Beginning in 1969, when the first Australian Open was held on the Milton Courts at Brisbane, the tournament was open to all players, including professionals who were not allowed to play the traditional circuit. Nevertheless, except for the 1969 and 1971 tournaments, many of the best players missed this championship until 1982, because of the remoteness, the inconvenient dates (around Christmas and New Year's Day) and the low prize money. In 1970, George MacCall's National Tennis League, which employed Rod Laver, Ken Rosewall, Andrés Gimeno, Pancho Gonzales, Roy Emerson and Fred Stolle, prevented its players from entering the tournament because the guarantees were insufficient. The tournament was won by Arthur Ashe.

In 1983, Ivan Lendl, John McEnroe and Mats Wilander entered the tournament. Wilander won the singles title and both his Davis Cup singles rubbers in the Swedish loss to Australia at Kooyong shortly after. Following the 1983 Australian Open, the International Tennis Federation prompted the Lawn Tennis Association of Australia to change the site of the tournament, because the Kooyong stadium was then inappropriate to serve such a big event. In 1988 the tournament was first held at Flinders Park (later renamed Melbourne Park). The change of the venue also led to a change of the court surface from grass to a hard court surface known as Rebound Ace.

Mats Wilander was the only player to win the tournament on both grass and hard courts. In 2008, after being used for 20 years, the Rebound Ace was replaced by a cushioned, medium-paced, acrylic surface known as Plexicushion Prestige. Roger Federer and Serena Williams are the only players to win the Australian Open on both Rebound Ace and Plexicushion Prestige. The main benefits of the new surface are better consistency and less retention of heat because of a thinner top layer. This change was accompanied by changes in the surfaces of all lead-up tournaments to the Australian Open. The change was controversial because of the new surface's similarity to DecoTurf, the surface used by the US Open.

Before the Melbourne Park stadium era, tournament dates fluctuated as well, in particular in the early years because of the climate of each site or exceptional events. For example, the 1919 tournament was held in January 1920 (the 1920 tournament was played in March) and the 1923 tournament in Brisbane took place in August when the weather was not too hot and wet. After a first 1977 tournament was held in December 1976 – January 1977, the organisers chose to move the next tournament forward a few days, then a second 1977 tournament was played (ended on 31 December), but this failed to attract the best players.

From 1982 to 1985, the tournament was played in mid-December. Then it was decided to move the next tournament to mid-January (January 1987), which meant no tournament was organized in 1986. Since 1987, the Australian Open date has not changed (except for 2021, when it was postponed by three weeks to February due to the COVID-19 pandemic). Some top players, including Roger Federer and Rafael Nadal, have said in the past that the tournament is held too soon after the Christmas and New Year holidays, and expressed a desire to consider shifting the tournament to February. Such a change, however, would move the tournament outside Australia's summer school holiday period, potentially impacting attendance figures.

New South Wales and overseas authorities proposed becoming the new hosts of the tournament in 2008, though such a move never materialised. In any case, it was around this time the Melbourne Park precinct commenced upgrades which enhanced facilities for players and spectators.

In 2015 activists opposed to the Australian policy of indefinite imprisonment for refugees who arrive by sea interrupted play during the men's final hoisting a banner reading "Australia Open For Refugees.

Notably a retractable roof was placed over Margaret Court Arena, making the Open the first of the four Grand Slams to have retractable roofs available on three of their main courts. The player and administrative facilities, as well as access points for spectators, were improved and the tournament site expanded its footprint out of Melbourne Park into nearby Birrarung Marr. A fourth major show court, seating 5,000 people was completed in late 2021, along with the rest of decade-long redevelopment, which included the Centrepiece ballroom, function and media building, as well as other upgraded facilities for players, administrators and spectators.

In December 2018, tournament organisers announced the Australian Open would follow the examples set by Wimbledon and the US Open and introduce tie-breaks in the final sets of men's and women's singles matches. Unlike Wimbledon and the US Open, which initiated conventional tie-breaks at 12–12 games and 6–6 games respectively, the Australian Open utilises a first to 10 points breaker at 6 games all. In 2020, the tournament organisers decided to replace the official court manufacturer to GreenSet, though retained the iconic blue cushioned acrylic hardcourt.

In 2021, in an effort to reduce the number of staff on-site due to the COVID-19 pandemic, all matches used electronic line judging. It marked the first-ever Grand Slam tournament to exclusively use electronic line judging; the 2020 US Open used it for matches outside of the two main stadium courts. The Australian Open is also the first major sporting event to use NFTs and the metaverse. The court was split into 6,776 squares that each corresponded to a tennis ball NFT. These tennis ball NFTs would change based on where points were scored during the tournament, as determined by the electronic line judging. The project also built a real-life replica of the precinct in Decentraland where people could spectate and interact with each other in real time. The Australian Open Artball NFTs generated over $5 million in revenue and won a Cannes Lions Award for Sports Entertainment.

Courts
The Australian Open is played at Melbourne Park, which is located in the Melbourne Sports and Entertainment Precinct; the event moved to this site in 1988. Currently three of the courts have retractable roofs, allowing play to continue during rain and extreme heat. As of 2017, spectators can also observe play at Show Courts 2 and 3, which have capacities of 3,000 each, as well as at Courts 4–15, 19 and 20 with the aid of temporary seating grandstands of capacity anywhere from 50 to 2,500.

Construction of a new 5,000 seat capacity stadium began in 2019 as part of a $271 million redevelopment of the precinct. The new stadium, Kia Arena, was unveiled by Australian Open officials on 22 November 2021.

Since 2008, all of the courts used during the Australian Open are hard courts with Plexicushion acrylic surfaces (though Melbourne Park does have eight practice clay courts these are not used for the tournament). This replaced the Rebound Ace surface used from the opening of Melbourne Park. The ITF rated the surface's speed as medium.

Ranking points

Ranking points for the men (ATP) and women (WTA) have varied at the Australian Open through the years but presently players receive the following points:

Prize money and trophies
The prize money awarded in the men's and women's singles tournaments is distributed equally. The total prize money for the 2023 tournament in Australian dollars is AUD $76,500,000. 
The prize money distribution is as follows: 

 Doubles prize money is per team.

Trophies
The names of the tournament winners are inscribed on the perpetual trophy cups.

The women's singles winner is presented with the Daphne Akhurst Memorial Cup.
The men's singles winner is presented with the Norman Brookes Challenge Cup.

Champions

Former champions
 Men's singles, winners of the Norman Brookes Challenge Cup.
 Women's singles, winners of the Daphne Akhurst Memorial Cup.
 Men's doubles
 Women's doubles
 Mixed doubles
 All champions

Current champions

Most recent finals

Records

 Unlike the other three Grand Slam tournaments, which became open in 1968, the Australian tournament opened to professionals in 1969.

Television coverage and attendance

From 1973 to 2018, the Seven Network served as the host broadcaster of the Australian Open. In March 2018, it was announced that the Nine Network had acquired the rights to the tournament beginning in 2020, for a period of five years. The network later bought the rights for the 2019 tournament as well. The Open's broadcast rights are lucrative in the country, as it occurs near the end of the Summer non-ratings season — which gives its broadcaster opportunities to promote their upcoming programming lineup.

In Europe the tournament is broadcast on Eurosport. Other broadcasters in the region have included the BBC in the United Kingdom, SRG in Switzerland, NOS in Netherlands and RTS in Serbia. In the United Kingdom, the BBC dropped its live coverage of the 2016 tournament just a month before the start due to budget cuts, leaving Eurosport as the exclusive live broadcaster.

Elsewhere, beIN Sports broadcasts it into the Middle East and northern Africa, and SuperSport in sub-Sahara Africa. In the United States, the tournament is broadcast on ESPN2, ESPN3 and the Tennis Channel, with limited highlights airing on ABC. The championship matches are televised live on ESPN. While it is broadcast on ESPN International in Central and Latin America. It is broadcast on TSN in Canada.

In the Asia–Pacific region, the tournament is broadcast on five television networks in China, including national broadcaster CCTV, provincial networks Beijing TV, Shanghai Dragon TV and Guangdong TV and English language Star Sports, as well as online on iQIYI Sports. Elsewhere in the region, it is broadcast in Japan by national broadcaster NHK, and pay-TV network Wowow. In the Indian subcontinent, Sony Six has broadcast since 2015 and, in the rest of Asia, it is broadcast on Fox Sports Asia until the network's shutdown in 2021 and the rights is acquired by beIN Sports from 2022 except for Vietnam which will be broadcast on K+.

Attendance
The following record of attendance begins in 1987, when the tournament moved from being held in December to in January (the immediate preceding tournament was December 1985). 1987 was the last year that the Kooyong Tennis Club hosted the tournament; since 1988 it has been held at Melbourne Park. The average growth rate over the period covered below is more than 7%.

2023: 902,312
2022: 346,468
2021: 130,374
2020: 812,174
2019: 796,435
2018: 743,667
2017: 728,763
2016: 720,363
2015: 703,899
2014: 643,280
2013: 684,457
2012: 686,006
2011: 651,127
2010: 653,860
2009: 603,160
2008: 605,735
2007: 554,858
2006: 550,550
2005: 543,873
2004: 521,691
2003: 512,225
2002: 518,248
2001: 543,834
2000: 501,251
1999: 473,296
1998: 434,807
1997: 391,504
1996: 389,598
1995: 311,678
1994: 332,926
1993: 322,074
1992: 329,034
1991: 305,048
1990: 312,000
1989: 289,023
1988: 244,859
1987: 140,089

See also

 Australian Open extreme heat policy
 Australian Open series

Lists of champions
List of Australian Open champions (all events)
List of Australian Open men's singles champions
List of Australian Open women's singles champions
List of Australian Open men's doubles champions 
List of Australian Open women's doubles champions
List of Australian Open mixed doubles champions
List of Australian Open singles finalists during the Open Era, records and statistics 
List of Australian Open broadcasters 
Other Grand Slam tournaments
French Open
The Championships, Wimbledon
US Open

Notes

References

External links
 Official website 
 Tennis Australia website
 Australian Open – All winners and runners-up. Reference book

 
Tennis tournaments in Australia
Sports competitions in Melbourne
1905 establishments in Australia
Annual sporting events in Australia
Grand Slam (tennis) tournaments
Major tennis tournaments
Hard court tennis tournaments
Recurring sporting events established in 1905
Seven Sport
January sporting events